Olio Township is located in Woodford County, Illinois. As of the 2010 census, its population was 4,931 and it contained 1,879 housing units.

The largest named community in Olio Township is the city of Eureka, the Woodford County seat.

Geography

Demographics

Footnotes

External links
City-data.com
Illinois State Archives

Townships in Woodford County, Illinois
Peoria metropolitan area, Illinois
Townships in Illinois